Saint Viator may refer to:

Viator of Bergamo (d. 370), Italian saint, and second bishop of Bergamo
Viator of Lyons, 4th century French saint, a lector at the cathedral of Lyons 
St. Viator High School, in Arlington Heights, Illinois
St. Viator College, Catholic institution in Bourbonnais, Illinois